Sloane is a surface light rail transit (LRT) stop under construction on Line 5 Eglinton, a new line that is part of the Toronto subway system. It is located in the Victoria Village neighbourhood at the intersection of Eglinton Avenue and Bermondsey Road/Sloane Avenue. It is scheduled to open in 2023.

The stop is located in the middle of Eglinton Avenue East on the east side of its intersection with Bermondsey Road and Sloane Avenue. The stop will have a centre platform. Access to the platforms will be via the pedestrian crossing on the east side of the signalized street intersection. East of the stop, between the two mainline tracks, there is a double-ended siding for trains to enter and exit from either direction on either main track.

During the planning stages for Line 5 Eglinton, the stop was given the working name "Bermondsey" after Bermondsey Road on the south side of Eglinton Avenue. On January 14, 2016, the  Metrolinx board of directors approved changing the stop name to "Sloane" after Sloane Avenue on the north side.

Surface connections 

, the following are the proposed connecting routes that would serve this station when Line 5 Eglinton opens:

References

External links

Line 5 Eglinton stations